Bhawoh Papi Jue (born May 24, 1979) is a Liberian former American football safety. He was originally drafted by the Green Bay Packers in the third round of the 2001 NFL Draft. He played college football at Penn State.

He has also been a member of the San Diego Chargers, St. Louis Rams, Arizona Cardinals, and Florida Tuskers. He is distinguished as being the first Liberian to play in the National Football League.

Early years
Jue and his mother immigrated from Liberia to the US when he was a year old. He lived in California and Rhode Island before settling in Virginia.

Jue attended Chantilly High School in Chantilly, Virginia, where he was a two-sport letterman in American football and basketball. He also ran track and field. As a senior, he helped lead Chantilly to the 1996 Virginia State AAA Football title, making 73 tackles and 3 interceptions as a defensive back and rushing for over 1,200 yards and 21 touchdowns as a tailback. That year, he was named a USA Today All-America selection, and Associated Press first-team All-State on both offense and defense. He also earned Region Defensive Player of the Year, and Conference Player of the Year.

College career
Jue attended Penn State University, from 1997–2001. He finished his career there with 99 tackles, 7 interceptions and 28 passes defended. As the Nittany Lion's starting left cornerback, he was named Honorable Mention All-Big Ten in 2000 and was selected to play in the 2001 Senior Bowl. During his college career, he also played in the Alamo Bowl and the Outback Bowl. Jue was roommates with three other future NFLers at Penn State: Omar Easy, John Gilmore and Tony Stewart.

NFL career

2001 NFL Draft
Jue was selected with the 71st pick in the third round of the 2001 NFL Draft by the Green Bay Packers after his college career.

Green Bay Packers
Jue began the season switching between cornerback and safety, but was eventually permanently placed as a safety when he took over for the injured LeRoy Butler midway through the season. He totaled forty-six tackles with two interceptions, and was named the Packers' Defensive Rookie of the Year. His sophomore season was limited to four games after suffering various injuries that put him on injured reserve early in the year. In 2003, he played in all games, primarily on special teams and had a career best 1.5 sacks, coupled with twenty-seven solo tackles. The following season saw him make forty-two tackles with an interception.

San Diego Chargers
After the 2004 season, Jue left to sign with the San Diego Chargers. He set new career highs with forty-seven tackles and three interceptions. He spent most of the 2006 season as a reserve due to injury. On September 1, 2007 they released him.

St. Louis Rams
On October 10, 2007 Jue signed with the St. Louis Rams.  He was cut by the St. Louis Rams on November 6, 2007.

Personal
His name Bhawoh (pronounced "bau") means “very powerful man.” Jue's name is easily mispronounced, lending him the nickname of au jus.

External links
Arizona Cardinals bio
St. Louis Rams bio

References

1979 births
Living people
People from Chantilly, Virginia
Sportspeople from Monrovia
Sportspeople from Fairfax County, Virginia
American people of Liberian descent
Liberian players of American football
American football safeties
Penn State Nittany Lions football players
Green Bay Packers players
San Diego Chargers players
St. Louis Rams players
Arizona Cardinals players
Florida Tuskers players
Chantilly High School alumni